Steven Haworth Miller (born October 5, 1943) is an American musician. He is the founder and only original remaining member of the Steve Miller Band, which he founded in 1966, and is the principal songwriter, lead singer, harmonicist, keyboardist, and one of the guitarists. He began his career in blues and blues rock and evolved to a more pop-oriented arena rock genre during the mid-1970s through the early 1980s, releasing popular singles and albums. Miller was inducted into the Rock and Roll Hall of Fame in 2016.

Early years
Born in Milwaukee, Miller received his first exposure to music from his mother, Bertha, whom he described as a remarkable jazz-influenced singer, and his father, George, a physician known as "Sonny" who, in addition to his profession as a pathologist, was a jazz enthusiast and an accomplished amateur recording engineer. Guitar virtuoso Les Paul and his musical partner Mary Ford were regular visitors at the Miller house. The Millers were the best man and the matron of honor at the December 1949 Paul/Ford wedding. Paul became Steve's godfather. Les Paul heard Steve, who was six, on a wire recording made by Dr. Miller, "banging away" on a guitar given to him by his uncle, Dr. K. Dale Atterbury. Paul encouraged Miller to continue with his interest in the guitar... and "perhaps he will be something one day."

In 1950, the family relocated to Dallas. Many distinguished musicians came to their house to record and Steve absorbed much from "greats" such as T-Bone Walker, Charles Mingus, and Tal Farlow. Walker taught Steve how to play his guitar behind his back and also with his teeth in 1952. In 1955, Steven began attending St. Mark's School in Dallas, a non-denominational preparatory day school for boys where he formed his first band, The Marksmen. 

He taught his older brother Buddy to play the bass guitar and also instructed his classmate, future musical star Boz Scaggs, on guitar chords so that he could join the band. After leaving St. Mark's—"I got kicked out", he recalled with a laugh in a 2004 interview—he then attended a school in the Lakewood area of Dallas, Woodrow Wilson High School from which he graduated in 1961. He was inducted into Woodrow's Hall of Fame in 2009.  Another member is Dusty Hill of ZZ Top.

In 1962, Miller returned to Wisconsin, and entered the University of Wisconsin–Madison, where he formed The Ardells. Scaggs joined the Ardells the next year, and Ben Sidran became the band's keyboardist in the following year. After attending the University of Copenhagen in Denmark for a semester in his senior year to study comparative literature, Miller dropped out six credit hours shy of a literature degree, opting to pursue a music career with his mother's encouragement and his father's misgivings:
[Interviewer:] When you look back over the span of your career, what are the lasting moments, the sweetest highs?
[Miller:] I would have to say my father's relationship with Les Paul and T-Bone Walker when I was young. Growing up in Dallas, being part of that phenomenal music scene. I found a way to do what I really wanted to do, which is so important for a kid. Near the end of college, my parents said, 'Steve, what are you going to do?' I said, 'I want to go to Chicago and play the blues.' My father looked at me like I was insane. But my mom said, 'You should do it now.' So I went to Chicago. And that was a special time. I played with Muddy Waters and Howlin' Wolf. I got to work with adults and realized music was what I wanted to do, what I loved.

Upon his return to the United States, Miller moved to Chicago where he immersed himself in the city's blues scene. During his time there, he worked with harmonica player Paul Butterfield and jammed with blues greats Muddy Waters, Howlin' Wolf, and Buddy Guy, all of whom encouraged the young guitarist to pursue music. In 1965, Miller and keyboardist Barry Goldberg formed the Goldberg-Miller Blues Band and began playing on the Chicago club scene. They signed with Epic Records and released a single, "The Mother Song". They began a residency at a New York City blues club.

When Miller returned from New York, he was disappointed by the Chicago blues scene, so he moved to Texas in hopes of finishing his education at the University of Texas at Austin. He was disenchanted with academic politics at the university and took a Volkswagen Bus his father had given him heading to San Francisco. After arriving he used his last $5 to see the Butterfield Blues Band and Jefferson Airplane at the Fillmore Auditorium. He fell in love with the vibrant San Francisco music scene and decided to stay.

Steve Miller Band

In 1966, he formed the Steve Miller Band (at first called The Steve Miller Blues Band), with Miller doing the vocals. They backed Chuck Berry on his Live at Fillmore Auditorium album released that year. In 1968, they released an album, Children of the Future, the first in a series of discs rooted solidly in the psychedelic blues style that then dominated the San Francisco scene. Writing in Crawdaddy!, Peter Knobler called the album "a triple moment of experience, knowledge, inspiration". Boz Scaggs rejoined Miller for this album and the next one, before starting his solo career.

The group followed the release of their second album, Sailor, with Brave New World, Your Saving Grace, and Number 5. These albums performed respectably on the U.S. Billboard 200 chart but failed to yield a major hit single. The highest single was "Livin' in the USA" from Sailor. Songs from this period are featured in a portion of the double album compilation Anthology, which includes a guest appearance on bass guitar, drums, and backing vocals by Paul McCartney (as Paul Ramon) on "Celebration" and "My Dark Hour".

Miller established his persona of the "Gangster of Love" (from Sailor) and the "Space Cowboy" (from Brave New World), which were reused in later works. In 1972, Miller recorded the album Recall the Beginning...A Journey from Eden, in which a third persona, "Maurice", was introduced in the tune "Enter Maurice".

In 1973, The Joker marked the start of the second phase of Miller's career: this work was less blues oriented and simpler in composition. The album received significant radio airplay, which helped the title track reach number one on the Billboard Hot 100 chart. The single hit No 1 on the UK Singles Chart in September 1990 after it was used for a television commercial.

Miller followed up with Fly Like an Eagle in 1976, and Book of Dreams in 1977. (The songs for both had been recorded at the same time, and released over two single albums rather than one double-album.) This pair of albums represented the peak of Miller's commercial career, both reaching the top echelons of the album charts and spawning a lengthy series of hit singles, including "Fly Like an Eagle", "Rock'n Me", "Take the Money and Run", "Jet Airliner", and "Jungle Love". The Steve Miller Band co-headlined a major stadium tour with the Eagles in 1978.

The Steve Miller Band's ongoing popularity has been notable. In 1978, Greatest Hits 1974–78 was released, featuring the big hits from his two most popular albums, Fly Like an Eagle and Book of Dreams along with the title track from The Joker. This popularity also fueled successful concert tours throughout the 1980s and 1990s, often with large numbers of younger people being present at the concerts, many of whom were fans of the big hits and inevitably purchased the greatest hits album. Miller would often headline shows with other classic rock acts, and played a variety of his music, including a selection of his blues work dating from the late 1960s.

1980s and later
Miller developed a high degree of music business acumen. He knew that songs earn individual publishing royalties no matter what their length and separated the 57-second electronic introduction from the song "Sacrifice" on Book of Dreams, named it "Electro Lux Imbroglio", and published it separately earning thousands of extra dollars as a result. On the heels of this massive success, Miller took a long hiatus from recording and touring, emerging in 1981 with Circle of Love. Sales were disappointing, however, and in 1982 he returned to the pop formula with another hit album, Abracadabra. This was Miller's last great commercial success; a series of collections, live albums and attempts to find a new style appeared in 1984 (Italian X-Rays), 1986 (Living in the 20th Century), and 1988 (Born 2B Blue). He released Wide River in 1993, which was his only studio release of new material between 1988 and 2010.

Miller released Bingo! on June 15, 2010. The album of blues covers, issued through his own Space Cowboy label in partnership with Roadrunner Records/ Loud & Proud Records, was his first studio album release since 1993. Let Your Hair Down, a companion release to Bingo!, was released 10 months later (on April 18, 2011).

For the 2010–11 academic year, Miller was an Artist in Residence at the USC Thornton School of Music, where he taught students in the Popular Music and Music Industry programs.

At a guitar auction in 2011, Miller said that he owned 450 guitars.

In 2016, Miller was inducted into the Rock and Roll Hall of Fame. The ceremony caused controversy because of Miller's disparaging remarks about the experience being "unpleasant" saying that the Hall of Fame was misogynistic, and ignoring the "need to respect the artists they say they're honoring, which they don't." His speech that night only hinted at his anger, congenially thanking the Rock and Roll Hall of Fame "for all of your hard work on behalf of all musicians," but adding, "and I encourage you to keep expanding your vision, to be more inclusive of women and to be more transparent in your dealings with the public, and most importantly, to do much more to provide music in our schools." Miller himself said part of his angry behavior that evening was because the Hall vetoed his proposal to be inducted by Elton John, as he "knows me and probably knows my music better than most people", and its controlling aspects such as the licensing contracts. The Black Keys, who were asked to induct Miller and accepted, having been long-time fans, later stated that they regretted the experience. Dan Auerbach said that for him and Patrick Carney, the unpleasant experience was being around Miller, as he had no idea who the band was and did not care. Auerbach and Carney left the ceremony as soon as they finished their speech, instead of staying for the entire event.

Personal life
Miller has been married four times and his current wife is Janice Ginsberg Miller. From 1976 to 1986, Miller owned the Lippincott-Wagner House and a  ranch in the hamlet of Williams which is in rural southwestern Oregon. In 2015, it was placed on the National Register of Historic Places.

Discography

See also
Notable Alumni of St. Mark's School of Texas
Pompatus

References

External links

 Steve Miller Band Official Site
 

 "Rock legend Steve Miller on his first new album in 17 years" – Entertainment Weekly 6/14/2010
"Steve Miller Band and Preservation Hall Jazz Band make their Austin City Limits debuts." PBS 2011
Steve Miller Interview NAMM Oral History Library (2020)

1943 births
Living people
American rock guitarists
American male singer-songwriters
Capitol Records artists
American rock singers
Musicians from Milwaukee
St. Mark's School (Texas) alumni
Musicians from Dallas
University of Wisconsin–Madison alumni
Blues rock musicians
20th-century American singers
21st-century American singers
American male guitarists
Singer-songwriters from Texas
20th-century American guitarists
21st-century American guitarists
Guitarists from Wisconsin
Guitarists from Texas
Steve Miller Band members
20th-century American male singers
21st-century American male singers
Singer-songwriters from Wisconsin